Kirkie Lawson is a Scottish former professional footballer who played as a forward.

Career
Lawson played for Blantyre Victoria, Motherwell, Falkirk, Hamilton Academical and Shettleston.

References

Year of birth missing (living people)
Living people
Scottish footballers
Blantyre Victoria F.C. players
Motherwell F.C. players
Falkirk F.C. players
Hamilton Academical F.C. players
Glasgow United F.C. players
Scottish Football League players
Association football forwards